Creech Barrow Hill is a steep, conical hill,  (one source 637 feet) high, near the coast of Dorset, England, and the highest point of the Dorset Heaths. It has been described as "one of Dorset's most distinctive landmarks." Geologically, it is also the highest Cenozoic hill in England.

There is a single, round barrow at the summit that gives Creech Barrow Hill its name and, from some angles, the appearance of a double summit. To the southeast is Stone Hill Down long barrow. There is also a trig point on the summit.

The name of the hill means "hill" three times. "Creech" is derived from the Celtic crich = hill and "barrow" from the Saxon for "mound".

The hill is a classic viewpoint that was once the site of King John's hunting lodge.

References

Hills of Dorset